Crooked Run Valley Rural Historic District is a national historic district located near Paris, Fauquier County, Virginia. The district encompasses 386 contributing buildings, 27 contributing sites, and 21 contributing structures.  It includes the separately listed Delaplane Historic District and Paris Historic District.

It was listed on the National Register of Historic Places in 2004.

References

Historic districts in Fauquier County, Virginia
National Register of Historic Places in Fauquier County, Virginia
Historic districts on the National Register of Historic Places in Virginia